Great Britain and Northern Ireland, represented by the British Olympic Association (BOA), competed at the 2012 Summer Olympics in London, United Kingdom, from 27 July to 12 August 2012 as the host nation and the team of selected athletes was officially known as Team GB. British athletes have competed at every Summer Olympic Games in the modern era, alongside Australia, France and Greece, though Great Britain is the only one to have won at least one gold medal at all of them. London is the first city to host the Summer Olympics on three different occasions, having previously done so in 1908 and 1948. Soon, it will be joined by Paris in 2024 and Los Angeles in 2028 in hosting the Olympic Games for a third time. Team GB, organised by BOA, sent a total of 541 athletes, 279 men and 262 women, to the Games, and won automatic qualification places in all 26 sports.

The government agency UK Sport targeted a total of 48 to 70 medals, with a commitment of at least a minimum amount, one more than the team won at the 2008 Summer Olympics, and a fourth-place finish in the medal table. On 7 August 2012, Great Britain had reached its 48-medal target, and surpassed the 19 gold-medal tally from Beijing, making it the most successful Olympics since 1908.

Great Britain finished the Summer Olympic Games with a total of 65 medals (29 gold, 17 silver, and 19 bronze; after medal reallocation in men's high jump: 29 gold, 18 silver, and 18 bronze), coming third in the medal table rankings, and fourth in the total number of medal rankings. At least one medal was awarded to Team GB in seventeen sports, eleven of them containing at least one gold. British athletes dominated the medal standings in cycling, wherein they won a total of 12 Olympic medals, including 8 golds, 7 from the 10 track cycling events alone, and in equestrianism, wherein they won 5 medals including 3 golds from 6 events. Great Britain also topped the medal table in triathlon, boxing and rowing. Twelve British athletes won more than a single Olympic medal in London.

Among the nation's medalists were taekwondo jin Jade Jones, triathlete Alistair Brownlee, and slalom canoers Etienne Stott and Tim Baillie, who won Great Britain's first Olympic gold medals in their respective disciplines. Nicola Adams became the first female champion in Olympic boxing history as her sport made its debut at the Games.

Having never won a medal in dressage in Olympic history, British riders dominated the event in 2012, winning 2 golds (both team and individual) and a bronze, Charlotte Dujardin becoming one of five British double gold medal winners. Great Britain was the first nation other than Germany to win the team event since 1980. Andy Murray became the first British tennis player to claim an Olympic title since the sport was reintroduced as a full-medal discipline in 1988; he was also the only British athlete to win two medals in a single day. Double trap shooter Peter Wilson won the nation's first gold medal in his sport for 12 years.

By winning two gold medals in London, track cyclist Chris Hoy emerged as Great Britain's most successful athlete in Olympic history with a total of seven medals, including six golds which surpassed the five golds won by former rower Steve Redgrave. Hoy also tied for the most total Olympic medals for a Briton with road cyclist Bradley Wiggins, who won the gold in the men's time trial. Ben Ainslie became the most successful sailor in Olympic history, after winning his fourth gold medal in the Finn class. With three medals (two golds and one silver) in total, Victoria Pendleton became Great Britain's most successful female Olympic athlete, surpassing the record of two golds and one bronze medal, previously held by Kelly Holmes, and briefly shared with Rebecca Adlington.

For the first time in Olympic history, Great Britain had won a women's rowing gold; in the event, Great Britain secured three of the six gold medals in women's rowing. Heather Stanning and Helen Glover took the first Great Britain gold of the games in the women's pair, and the nation's first ever in women's rowing. Katherine Grainger, winning her first gold medal with Anna Watkins in the women's double sculls, became the first Great Britain female athlete to win four Olympic medals, and at four successive games (having previously won three silver medals). Swimmer Rebecca Adlington equalled the feat of four Olympic medals later on the same day. Sophie Hosking and Katherine Copeland, in the women's lightweight double sculls, completed the hat-trick as part of Super Saturday.

Despite the unprecedented success, Great Britain performed much more poorly in the team sports, winning just a single medal when Great Britain captained by Katie Walsh won the bronze medal match against New Zealand 3–1 in the Women's Field hockey tournament to win the first medal of any colour by a British field hockey team at a Summer Olympics since 1992.

Medallists

The team won 65 medals in total: 29 gold, 17 silver and 19 bronze; after medal reallocation in men's high jump: 29 gold, 18 silver, and 18 bronze. For each gold medallist, a post box was painted gold by Royal Mail in recognition of the achievement, usually in the competitor's home town. A first class stamp depicting each gold medal-winning individual or team was also produced.

The following British competitors won medals at the Games. In the 'by discipline' sections below, medallists' names are in bold.

|  style="text-align:left; width:78%; vertical-align:top;"|

| style="text-align:left; width:22%; vertical-align:top;" |

Multiple medallists

The following Team GB competitors won several medals at the 2012 Olympic Games.

"Super Saturday"
Day 8 (4 August) of the Games, which had been billed in the build up to the Games in the host country as "Super Saturday" due to the expected programme creating numerous strong medal possibilities for the hosts, saw Great Britain record their most successful day at the Olympics since the 1908 games. The day saw the team win 6 gold medals, starting in the rowing for Alex Gregory, Tom James, Pete Reed and Andrew Triggs Hodge in the men's coxless four and Katherine Copeland and Sophie Hosking in the women's lightweight double sculls, followed in the cycling by Dani King, Joanna Rowsell Shand and Laura Trott in the women's team pursuit. This was followed by three athletics gold medals in the space of 46 minutes, with Jessica Ennis winning gold in the women's heptathlon, Greg Rutherford in the men's long jump and Mo Farah in the men's 10,000 metres. Completing the medal total on the day in the rowing was a silver for Mark Hunter and Zac Purchase in the men's lightweight double sculls. Lord Coe, organiser of London 2012, described the unfolding of the day's events as "a narrative of infectious success" and the greatest day of sport he had ever witnessed.

Medal and performance targets

With Team GB attempting to build on their previous successes in Beijing four years earlier, expectations prior to the London Olympics were very high with the additional advantage of competing with home support. UK Sport, the body responsible for distributing £300 million in Olympic and Paralympic sports, revealed on 4 July 2012 a target of finishing in the top four of the medal table and winning at least 48 medals across at least 12 sports based on an aggregate medal range of 40–70. although a specific number of gold medals was not targeted.

Team GB was also highly rated by other expert and professional sport bodies prior to the Olympics. This included a team of experts invited by BBC Radio 5 live, which implied an estimated total of 95 medals: 27 gold, 25 silver and 43 bronze. Sports statistics provider Infostrada projected 57 medals, 16 of them gold. Sheffield Hallam University 56 medals, 27 of them gold; whilst Luciana Barra a former Italian Olympic Committee member, estimated 59 medals, 16 of them gold.

UK Sport set targets for medals and positions for each individual Olympic sports except Football.  These are listed in the table below, along with the actual Team GB performance.

The only sport which Team GB failed to meet its medal target was in Swimming.

UK Sport funding
In the Olympic cycle from 2008 until 2012 the government agency UK Sport allocated a total budget of more than £264 million towards funding Team GB and the individual athletes and teams specifically for the 2012 Olympic Games in London. The sports which received the highest funding were rowing, cycling, athletics, sailing, and swimming. The only sports on the Olympic Programme that were not given any funding by the body were football and beach volleyball.

Delegation

The team, known by the International Olympic Committee (IOC) as Great Britain, selects athletes from all four of the Home Nations (England, Northern Ireland, Scotland and Wales), as well as the three Crown Dependencies (Isle of Man, Jersey and Guernsey), and all but three of the British overseas territories (Cayman Islands, British Virgin Islands and Bermuda having their own NOCs). The team is organised by the British Olympic Association (BOA) who have since 1999 branded it Team GB, explaining that "Team GB is the Great Britain and Northern Ireland Olympic Team."

The BOA selected a team of 541 athletes, 279 men and 262 women,  to compete in all sports after gaining automatic qualification places in their respective events.

The BOA by-law preventing the selection of athletes sanctioned for anti-doping rule violations was struck down by the Court of Arbitration for Sport in April 2012, allowing the participation of Dwain Chambers, David Millar and Carl Myerscough.

British Olympic Association chief Colin Moynihan, 4th Baron Moynihan condemned the disproportionate number of British Olympic competitors who had attended expensive, elite private schools.  Twenty percent of all British Olympic competitors and 33% of the British participants in the rowing, sailing, and equestrian events, in which the host country won a number of medals, attended private schools.  Moynihan called the numbers, "one of the worst statistics in British sport" and said that it was "wrong and unacceptable" that so many elite British athletes came from privileged backgrounds.  Alan Bairner, professor of sport and social theory at Loughborough University, said that a primary factor in the numbers was the existence of excellent sports facilities and specialized coaching at the private schools and lack of the same at many state-sponsored schools.

The Great Britain kit was designed by Stella McCartney. In addition to the Olympic merchandise, a range of Team GB branded items went on sale including the BOA's official mascot Pride.

Competitors
The following is the list of number of competitors participating in the Games. Note that reserves for fencing, field hockey, football and handball are not counted as athletes:

Archery

As the host nation, Britain automatically received the full allocation of six individual places, alongside entry to both the men's and women's team events. Former medalist Alison Williamson competed in her sixth consecutive Summer Olympics, becoming only the third British athlete to do so, but failed to move past the first round. Both the women's and men's teams failed to progress further than the round of 16 after losing to the Russian and Ukrainian teams respectively, while no individual archers made it past the round of 16.

Men

Women

Athletics

In Athletics, the British team did not receive any automatic places for representing the host nation, as they had done in other sports. A squad of 77 athletes was initially selected for the Games. The selection of Lynsey Sharp as the team's sole representative in the 800m when there were three places available proved controversial. Sharp, who won the event at the GB Olympic trials, failed to achieve the 'A' qualifying standard. Under international rules, non 'A' standard competitors could only be selected if no other athletes that have met the standard were chosen. As a result, Sharp's inclusion meant the exclusion of four other runners that had achieved the 'A' standard, including 2011 European Athletics Indoor Championships gold medallist Jenny Meadows.

Gareth Warburton was initially not selected for the 800 metres, having failed to achieve the 'A' qualifying standard at the 2012 European Athletics Championships in Helsinki, but was granted a place at the Games following an appeal. Ten other British athletes were unsuccessful with their appeals to be included. David Webb was initially chosen as part of the squad for the men's marathon but withdrew on 25 July due to injury. No replacement was selected. Paula Radcliffe was initially chosen as part of the squad for the women's marathon but withdrew on 29 July due to injury; Freya Murray was called up as her replacement. Welshman Dai Greene was selected to captain the athletics squad, reprising a role he had first served at the 2011 European Team Championships in Sweden.

In the Games, Great Britain had their best track and field performance since the Moscow Games in 1980, with 4 gold medals including a double gold for Mo Farah over the 5,000 and 10,000 metres. Pre-event favourites Farah in the 10,000 metres, Jessica Ennis in heptathlon, and the world leading, but slightly less favoured Greg Rutherford in the long jump, won 3 gold medals for Great Britain in the space of 49 minutes on the middle Saturday of the Games.

 Ranks given for track events are within the athlete's heat only
 Q Qualified for the next round
 q Qualified for the next round as a fastest loser or, in field events, by position without achieving the qualifying target
 NR National record
 WB World Best
 N/A Round not applicable for the event
 Bye Athlete not required to compete in round

Men

Track & road events

* Competed in relay heats only

Field event

Combined events – Decathlon

Women

Track & road events

* Competed in relay heats only

Field events

Combined events – Heptathlon

Badminton

As hosts, Team GB were entitled to enter two badminton players regardless of how they fared in qualifying. At the qualification date, Team GB had qualified four places; a single player in each singles event, and a pair in the mixed doubles.

Basketball

Basketball was the only sport in which Great Britain were not guaranteed entry as hosts in 2012. In early 2011, FIBA granted the men's and women's teams automatic qualification. Until 2006, England, Scotland, Wales and Northern Ireland competed as separate teams.

Men's tournament

Roster

Group play

Women's tournament

Roster

Group play

Boxing

Men
Britain was guaranteed five male boxers at the Games and one female entrant, by virtue of being the host nation.  However following the 2011 World Championships, five British boxers had claimed their places. The special 'host' places for men's boxing therefore became void. The boxers who qualified through the world championships were; Andrew Selby, Luke Campbell, Tom Stalker, Fred Evans and Anthony Joshua.

Following the World Championships Andrew Selby and Khalid Yafai had both attained the qualification standard for the Olympics in the flyweight division. NOCs may only nominate one boxer per event, and since both had reached the quarter finals of the World Championships, a box off was required. The box off took place at the York Hall during the 2011 British Championships in November. Selby won the first bout, following which Yafai failed to make the weight for the second bout by 300 grams, meaning that Selby would represent Great Britain at the Olympics.

In the subsequent AIBA European Qualification Tournament, two further boxers, Josh Taylor and Anthony Ogogo, also qualified.

Women
Qualification for the women's events was held at the AIBA 2012 Women's World Championships only. On 16 May 2012, Natasha Jonas qualified in the 60 kg category, and Nicola Adams in the 51 kg category. As a result, the host quota place in women's boxing became void.  On 18 May 2012 Savannah Marshall qualified in the 75 kg category, ensuring Great Britain is represented at all women's weights at the first Olympic Games featuring the women's discipline.

Canoeing

Slalom
Britain qualified the maximum of one boat in all four classes, at the 2011 World Championships.

Places were allocated in Team GB in a qualification event in April 2012. As stated above, Great Britain was entitled to one quota of two canoeists in the men's C-2 event; however, as the successful C-2 canoeists Florence and Hounslow had already qualified in the individual events, a quota for a second boat in C-2 became available.

Sprint
The canoe sprint allocation for the host nation was one place in the men's K-1 1000 m, men's C-1 1000 m and women's K-1 500 m. Team GB was expected to earn a healthy number of British quota places.

Men

Women

 FA Qualify to final (medal)
 FB Qualify to final B (non-medal)

Cycling

Great Britain selected 27 cyclists across the four cycling disciplines. Included in the squad was David Millar, who was cleared to compete after a British Olympic Association rule preventing any athlete formerly banned for doping from Olympic selection, was overturned.

In the road events Bradley Wiggins won the gold medal and Chris Froome the bronze in the men's time trial. This was Wiggins seventh Olympic medal and took him past Steve Redgrave as the British athlete with the most Olympic medals.  He also became the first man to win the Tour de France and an Olympic gold medal in the same year.

On the track the men's sprint team of Chris Hoy, Jason Kenny and Philip Hindes set new world records in both the first round and again in the final against France as they won the gold medal. Hoy joined Steve Redgrave as the only British athletes to win five Olympic gold medals. A sixth gold medal in the men's Keirin brought Hoy past the record of Redgrave, and brought him equal with Wiggins on seven Olympic medals

Road

Great Britain qualified for a maximum five quota places in the men's Olympic road race by virtue of their top 10 national ranking in the 2011 UCI World Tour. They qualified a maximum 4 quota places in the women's event by virtue of a top 5 national ranking by the end of May 2012.

The BOA announced the five man squad of road racers for Team GB on 4 July 2012.

Men

Women

Track
Qualification for the ten events to be held in the Olympic velodrome was entirely dependent on UCI rankings. Entry was limited to one rider, or as the case may be one team, per nation. Nations are also limited to 14 riders in total, although 2 riders from other cycling disciplines may also be called upon.

Great Britain qualified in all track events. On 18 June 2012, British Cycling confirmed two accredited 'P' places – sprinters Ross Edgar and Becky James – essentially, substitute riders officially selected for the Olympic squad in the event of injury or illness. Competitors in the individual sprint and keirin events to be chosen from respective team sprint squads.

Sprint

Team sprint

Pursuit

 Andy Tennant and Wendy Houvenaghel were selected as part of the pursuit squads but did not ride during the event.

Keirin

Omnium

Mountain biking

BMX
The cyclists below were selected for the BMX events. On 18 June 2012, British Cycling announced that two further riders – Kyle Evans and Abbie Taylor – had been granted 'P' accreditations, and would be substitute riders in the event of illness or injury.

Diving

As hosts Great Britain were automatically entitled to places in all four synchronised diving events, but athletes for individual events had to qualify through their own performances. Through finishes at the 2011 World Aquatics Championships, the 2012 FINA Diving World Cup event in London, and the dive-off on the final day of the 2012 event, Great Britain achieved the maximum allowable number of quota places; two in each individual event.

Men

Women

Equestrian

Great Britain automatically received a team and the maximum number of individual competitors in each of the 3 disciplines; dressage, eventing and show jumping.

Dressage

Eventing

* Piggy French, riding DHI Topper W, was originally selected by Team GB, but withdrew on 2 July 2012 due to an injury to her horse. Nicola Wilson was promoted from the reserve team

Show jumping

 JO Jump off for gold medal

Fencing

As hosts, Great Britain received eight quota places which could be allocated to any of the fencing events. Additional places could be won in specific disciplines in a series of qualification events.

On 24 March 2012, Richard Kruse won a qualifying event in Copenhagen, thus earning Team GB a ninth quota place in men's foil. On 22 April 2012, Natalia Sheppard attained a qualifying place at the Zonal European Qualifier in women's foil. On 1 June 2012, the BOA announced the first seven of ten fencers, and confirmed the remaining three fencers would be in foil events.

Men

Women

Field hockey

The Great Britain men's and women's teams qualified automatically as hosts. England, Wales and Scotland compete separately in most competitions, but sent a combined team to the Olympics, which was managed by England Hockey.

Men's tournament

Head coach Jason Lee appeared at his fifth Olympics, having played for Great Britain in 1992 and 1996, and been head coach in 2004 and 2008.

Group play

Semi-final

Bronze medal match

Women's tournament

Squad

Group play

Semi-final

Bronze medal match

Final rank

Football

Great Britain men's football team competed at the Olympics for the first time since 1960. The team was run by The Football Association, as the national associations of Scotland, Wales and Northern Ireland declined to take part. However, despite objections from Scotland, Wales and Northern Ireland, players from all four nations were considered for selection, although Ryan Giggs, Craig Bellamy, Aaron Ramsey, Neil Taylor and Joe Allen (all Welsh) were the only non-English players who were selected. However, players chosen to represent England at the 2012 European Championships were not considered for selection, although one player (Jack Butland) received special dispensation to compete. Former England captain David Beckham, who was involved in promoting London's bid to host the Games, had expressed an interest in appearing as one of the three over-23 players in the squad. The men's team was managed by Stuart Pearce and the women's by Hope Powell.

 Men's team event – 1 team of 18 players
 Women's team event – 1 team of 18 players

Men's tournament

Squad

Group play

Quarter-final

Women's tournament

Squad

Group play

Quarter-final

Gymnastics

Artistic
Great Britain fielded a full team of five gymnasts in both the men's and women's artistic gymnastics events. The women's team qualified through a top eight finish in the 2011 World Artistic Gymnastics Championships, whilst the men qualified by winning the Olympic qualification event, after failing to qualify at the world championships. Included in the squads were Louis Smith, who won a bronze medal in the pommel horse at the 2008 Games, Beth Tweddle, 2009 World Floor Champion and 2010 Uneven Bars Champion, and Rebecca Tunney, who, at the age of 15, was the youngest Team GB athlete from any sport.

Men

Team

Individual finals

Women

Team

Individual finals

* Whelan's vault score was wiped after she fell face first during her landing.

Rhythmic
The British Olympic Association announced that the team would utilise host nation qualification places. However an agreement between British Gymnastics and the BOA stipulated that the team had to reach a target score  (45.223) at a test event held in London in January 2012. They narrowly missed this target in the qualification stage by 0.273 marks. though they met the mark on the finals day.

This led to a dispute in which British Gymnastics originally argued that they should not be included in the Games as they had failed to make the mark in the agreed manner; the gymnasts argued that it was not clear the mark had to be reached on the qualification round, and that their mark in the final day (which was over the target mark) should be accepted.

On 5 March 2012, the gymnasts won their appeal, and British Gymnastics announced that the team would now be nominated for selection.

Trampoline

Handball

Great Britain's men's and women's handball teams were allowed to take up host places at the 2012 Olympics. This is the first time that Great Britain has competed in handball at the Olympics.

Men's tournament

Group A

Women's tournament

Squad

Group play

Judo

British judoka received one place in each of the 14 categories by virtue of hosting the Olympic tournament – the maximum allocation possible.

Men

Women

Modern pentathlon

As hosts, Great Britain received one automatic qualification place per gender. A maximum of two British men and two British women were able to qualify for modern pentathlon events. In the event, Great Britain earned two quota places in each gender.

Rowing

Great Britain qualified boats in 13 of the 14 Olympic events at the 2011 World Championships; the only boat which Britain did not qualify for the Olympics was in the women's single sculls event where Frances Houghton was one place short.

In the heats of the women's coxless pair, Helen Glover and Heather Stanning set a new Olympic record with a time of six minutes 57.29 seconds.

Men

Women

Qualification legend: FA, final A (medal); FB, final B (non-medal); FC, final C (non-medal); FD, final D (non-medal); FE, final E (non-medal); FF, final F (non-medal); SA/B, semifinals A/B; SC/D, semifinals C/D; SE/F, semifinals E/F; QF, quarterfinals; R, repechage

Sailing

As hosts, Great Britain received automatic qualification places in each boat class.

Men

Women

Fleet racing

Match racing

 Due to the lack of wind the 5–8th place classification races were cancelled. The final round robin table was used for classification.
 BFD Disqualified under the black flag rule.
 M Medal races. Points awarded in medal races are double the position achieved in the race.

Shooting

As the host nation, Great Britain were awarded a minimum of nine quota places in nine different events. Additional places have been secured by Richard Brickell in the men's skeet, Richard Faulds and Peter Wilson in the men's double trap and Georgina Geikie in women's 25 m pistol. In addition, a shooter that has qualified for one event may compete in others without affecting the quotas.

On 28 May 2012, the Great Britain team was confirmed.

Men

Women

Swimming

British swimmers have achieved qualifying standards in the following events (up to a maximum of 2 swimmers in each event at the Olympic Qualifying Time (OQT), and 1 at the Olympic Selection Time (OST)): All British swimmers must qualify by finishing in the top two of the Olympic trials having gained the GB qualifying A standard set by British Swimming in the relevant final (that time being the fastest time of the sixteenth fastest swimmer internationally in that event in 2011).

Men

Qualifiers for the latter rounds (Q) of all events were decided on a time only basis, therefore positions shown are overall results versus competitors in all heats.

Women

Qualifiers for the latter rounds (Q) of all events were decided on a time only basis, therefore positions shown are overall results versus competitors in all heats.
* Amy Smith tied equal with two other swimmers for the final spot in to the semi-finals. A swim-off was held between the three competitors, which Smith won and was awarded with the 16th qualification place in to the semi-finals.
** Competed in the heats only

Synchronised swimming

As the host nation, Great Britain will have a squad of 9 synchronised swimmers taking part in both the duet and team events. British Swimming announced the squad on 8 May 2012.

Table tennis

Team GB fielded a six-strong table tennis team at the 2012 Olympic Games after being granted permission to use host nation qualification places.

Taekwondo

Britain did not take any formal part in qualification tournaments in taekwondo, as the GB team already had four guaranteed places at their disposal, two for men, two for women.
British Taekwondo nominated four athletes to take up their host quota places.

The nomination of Lutalo Muhammad for the 80 kg class was originally rejected by the BOA on 31 May 2012, following concerns over the selection process. Muhammad, European champion, and world ranked number seven, at 87 kg had been nominated in preference to double European champion at 80 kg, and world ranked number one fighter at that weight, Aaron Cook (Muhammad was ranked below 50th in the world at that weight category, at which he had rarely fought recently). On 8 June 2012, Muhammad's renewed nomination was ratified.

Tennis

Great Britain had only two players that qualified automatically through their world ranking: world number four Andy Murray took part in the men's singles, and also played with his brother Jamie Murray, who had sufficiently high ranking in doubles, in the men's doubles. Ross Hutchins and Colin Fleming have also qualified for the men's doubles.

Great Britain did not have any other players with a sufficiently high world ranking to qualify automatically, and therefore applied for a number of wildcard places in the men's and women's draws. A total of four British players (two each in the women's singles and women's doubles) were given places, allowing Great Britain to take part in all five events (a pair for the mixed doubles will be selected at the Games). On 12 July, the IOC confirmed that withdrawals from the women's doubles event had created a vacancy in that event, and Great Britain's entries in the singles event, Elena Baltacha and Anne Keothavong would team up to enter. On 24 July, Heather Watson, one of Great Britain's other women's doubles pair, was given an entry to the women's singles as a replacement for Alona Bondarenko of Ukraine, who withdrew due to injury. Laura Robson replaced Croatian Petra Martić withdrew due to injury, chosen as an alternate replacement.

Men

Women

Mixed

Triathlon

Helen Jenkins became the second Briton to qualify for the Olympics, when she won the Dextro Energy Triathlon – ITU World Championship Series 2011 London event, meeting the British qualifying standards of finishing on the podium at the race over the Olympic course. The next day Alistair Brownlee and his brother Jonathan Brownlee became the third and fourth people to qualify for London, as Alistair won the race and Jonny came in third over the Olympic course.

Volleyball

As hosts, Great Britain gained automatic entry for men's and women's teams in both indoor and beach volleyball.

Beach

Indoor

Men's tournament

Squad

Group play

Women's tournament

Squad

Group play

Water polo

As hosts, Great Britain gained automatic entry for both men's and women's teams.

Men's tournament

Team roster

Group play

Women's tournament

Team roster

Group play

Quarter-final

Semi-final 5–8

Classification 7–8

Weightlifting

As the hosts, British weightlifters have already received three men's quota places and two women's places for the London Olympics. The GB team must allocate these places to individual athletes by 10 June 2012.

 Following disqualifications as a result of retested samples.

Wrestling

Great Britain were originally offered three guaranteed places at the Games as host nation. If any wrestlers qualify directly through the qualification process, these places were to be reduced.

On 29 May 2012, the BOA announced that British Wrestling had failed to meet the agreed criteria for the three quota places, and therefore only one quota place would be awarded. Ukrainian-born Olga Butkevych was selected in the women's 55 kg category.

Women's freestyle

Media coverage
The BBC paid  £40–50 million for the broadcast rights to the 2012 Olympic Games and showed around 5,800 hours of content over the 17 days of the Games, all of which was available in high definition. This is an increase on the amount of coverage shown at the 2008 Summer Olympics in Beijing when half of the international feed, 2,500 hours, was broadcast.  To accompany its coverage the BBC commissioned an anthem from the British band, Elbow, entitled "First Steps".

Victory parade

A celebratory parade took place in central London on 10 September 2012 to commemorate the Olympic and Paralympic Games.

See also 

 Great Britain at the 2012 Summer Paralympics

References 

Summer Olympics
2012
Nations at the 2012 Summer Olympics